The 2015 Bethune–Cookman Wildcats baseball team represents Bethune-Cookman University in the sport of baseball during the 2015 college baseball season.  The Wildcats competed in Division I of the National Collegiate Athletic Association (NCAA) and the Southern Division of the Mid-Eastern Athletic Conference (MEAC). The team is coached by Jason Beverlin, who is entering his fifth season at Bethune-Cookman.

Roster

Schedule

|- align="center" bgcolor="ffddd"
| February 13 ||  || || Statesboro, Ga. || 0–3 || Challenger (1–0) || Zuniga (0–1) || Brown (1) || 1382 || 0–1 ||
|- align="center" bgcolor="ffddd"
| February 14 || Georgia Southern || || Statesboro, Georgia || 8–12 || Richman (1–0) || Duprey (0–1) || Paesano (1) || 1108 || 0–2 ||
|- align="center" bgcolor="ffddd"
| February 15 || Georgia Southern || || Statesboro, Georgia || 8–9 || Brown (1–0) || Clymer (0–1) || || 1107 || 0–3 ||
|- align="center" bgcolor="ffddd"
| February 18 || UCF || || Orlando, Fl. || 2–10 || Meyer (1–0) || O'Brien (0–1) || || 99 || 0–4 || 
|- align="center" bgcolor="ffddd"
| February 20 ||  || || Daytona Beach, Fl. || 2–3 || Askew (2–0) || Clymer (0–2) || Kourtis (1) || 94 || 0–5 ||
|- align="center" bgcolor="ffddd"
| February 21 || Mercer || || Daytona Beach, Fl. || 3–8 || Herd (1–0) || Seibold (0–1) || || 102 || 0–6 ||
|- align="center" bgcolor="ffddd"
| February 22 || Mercer || || Daytona Beach< Fl. || 4-13 || Johnson (1-1) || Griffey (0-1) || || 52 || 0-7 ||
|- align="center" bgcolor="ffddd"
| February 24 ||  || || Daytona, Fla. || 5-6 || Wilson (3-0) || Calamita (0–1) || Sheller (1) || 82 || 0–8 ||
|- align="center" bgcolor="ffddd"
| February 25 || UCF || || Daytona Beach, Fla. || 8–18 || Hepple (1–0) || Norris (0–1) || || 41 || 0–9 ||
|- align="center" bgcolor="ffddd"
| February 28 || Florida A&M || || Daytona Beach, Fla. || 1–2 || Jarrell (1–1) || Griffey (0–2) || McDonald (2) || 41 || 0–10 || 0–1
|- bgcolor="#ddffdd"
| March 1 || Florida A&M || || Daytona Beach, Fla. || 6–2 || Zuniga (1–1) || Carrasco (0–3) || || 41 || 1–10 || 1–1
|- align="center" bgcolor="ffddd"
| March 1 || Florida A&M || || Daytona Beach, Fla. || 0–6 || Fleming (2–0) || Austin (0–1) || || 251 || 1–11 || 1–2
|- align="center" bgcolor="ffddd"
| March 4 ||  || || Daytona Beach, Fla. || 8–11 || Conway (1–0) || Duprey (0–2) || Butler (2) || 112 || 1–12 ||
|- bgcolor="#ddffdd"
| March 7 ||  || || Daytona Beach, Fla. || 6–1 || Seibold (1–1) || Quinn (1–3) || || 79 || 2–12 || 2–2
|- align="center" bgcolor="ffddd"
| March 7 || North Carolina Central || || Daytona Beach, Fla. || 0–4 || Dandridge (2–0) || Zuniga (1–2) || || 79 || 2–13 || 2–3
|- bgcolor="#ddffdd"
| March 8 || North Carolina Central || || Daytona Beach, Fla. || 11–7 || Norris (1–1) || Sweet (1–1) || || 81 || 3–13 || 3–3
|- align="center" bgcolor="ffddd"
| March 10 ||  || || Daytona Beach, Fla. || 6–15 || Shannahan (2–0) || Wilkes (0–1) || || 82 || 3–14 ||
|- align="center" bgcolor="ffddd"
| March 11 || South Florida || || Daytona Beach, Fla. || 0–1 || Valdes (1–1) || Lindsay (0–1) || Peterson (5) || 64 || 3–15 ||
|- bgcolor="#ddffdd"
| March 14 ||  || || Greensboro, NC. || 3–0 || Zuniga (2–2) || McQueen (0–2) || Clymer (1) || 55 || 4–15 || 4–3
|- bgcolor="#ddffdd"
| March 15 || North Carolina A&T || || Greensboro, NC. || 7–4 || Seibold (2–1) || Liang (0–2) || Clymer (2) || 56 || 5–15 || 5–3
|- bgcolor="#ddffdd"
| March 15 || North Carolina A&T || || Greensboro, NC. || 16–5 || Norris (2–1) || Poag (0–2) || || 69 || 6–15 || 6–3 
|- align="center" bgcolor="ffddd"
| March 17 || UCF || || Daytona Beach, Fla. || 13–18 || Meyer (2–0) || Duprey (0–3) || Rodgers (1) || 103 || 6–16 ||
|- align="center" bgcolor="ffddd"
| March 18 ||  || || Daytona Beach, Fla. || 0–15 || Labsan (1–0) || Lindsay (0–2) || || 68 || 6–17 ||
|- align="center" bgcolor="ffddd"
| March 20 ||  || || Fort Myers, Fla. || 0–5 || Murray (2–3) || Zuniga (0–3) || || 213 || 6–18 ||
|- align="center" bgcolor="ffddd"
| March 21 || FGCU || || Fort Myers, Fla. || 1–6 || Anderson (2–0) || Seibold (2–2) || || 210 || 6–19 ||
|- align="center" bgcolor="ffddd"
| March 22 || FGCU || || Fort Myers, Fla. || 8–9 || Desguin (2–0) || Lindsay (0–3) || Anderson (2) || 235 || 6–20 ||
|- bgcolor="#ddffdd"
| March 24 ||  || || Daytona Beach, Fla. || 3–2 (10) || Austin (1–1) || Diaz (0–1) || || 127 || 7–20 ||
|- align="center" bgcolor="ffddd"
| March 25 ||  || || Daytona Beach, Fla. || 5–11 (11) || Smith (3–1) || Pizarro (0–1) || || 79 || 7–21 || 
|- bgcolor="#ddffdd"
| March 28 ||  || || Daytona Beach, Fla. || 6–3 || Seibold (3–2) || Denny (3–1) || Clymer (3) || 211 || 8–21 || 7–3
|- bgcolor="#ddffdd"
| March 28 || Savannah State || || Daytona Beach, Fla. || 9–2 || Zuniga (3–3) || Robinson (4–1) || || 211 || 9–21 || 8–3
|- bgcolor="#ddffdd"
| March 29 || Savannah State || || Daytona Beach, Fla. || 3–2 || Austin (2–1) || Davis (1–3) || || 151 || 10–21 || 9–3
|- bgcolor="#ddffdd"
| March 31 || FIU || || Miami, Fla. || 7–4 || Austin (3–1) || Durruthy (0–1) || Clymer (4) || 232 || 11–21 || 
|- align="center" bgcolor="ffddd"
| April 1 || Miami (FL) || || Coral Gables, Fla. || 3–13 || Garcia (5–1) || Lindsay (0–4) || || 1950 || 11–22 ||
|- bgcolor="#ddffdd"
| April 3 || Florida A&M || || Tallahassee, Fla. || 4–1 || Zuniga (4–3) || Jarrell (1–4) || Clymer (5) || 229 || 12–22 || 10–3
|- align="center" bgcolor="ffddd"
| April 4 || Florida A&M || || Tallahassee, Fla. || 2–3 || Westbrook (3–0) || Hernandez (0–1) || || 141 || 12–23 || 10–4
|- bgcolor="#ddffdd"
| April 4 || Florida A&M || || Tallahassee, Fla. || 3–2 || Norris (3–1) || Anderson (0–3) || Clymer (6) || 141 || 13–23 || 11–4
|- align="center" bgcolor="ffddd"
| April 7 || North Florida || || Jacksonville, Fla. || 2–3 || Baker (3–2) || Seibold (3–3) || Olmstead (4) || 324 || 13–24 ||
|- bgcolor="#ddffdd"
| April 11 || North Carolina Central || || Durham, Nc. || 4–2 || Zuniga (5–3) || Quinn (3–5) || Clymer (7) || 351 || 14–24 || 12–4
|- align="center" bgcolor="ffddd"
| April 11 || North Carolina Central || || Durham, Nc. || 4–8 || Shields (2–3) || Hernandez (0–2) || Morgan (1) || 177 || 14–25 || 12–5
|- align="center" bgcolor="ffddd"
| April 12 || North Carolina Central || || Durham, Nc. || 3–8 || Sweet (4–2) || Seibold (3–4) || || 133 || 14–26 || 12–6
|- align="center" bgcolor="ffddd"
| April 14 || Jacksonville || || Jacksonville, Fla. || 0–16 || Perez (1–1) || Duprey (0–4) || || 100 || 14–27 ||
|- align="center" bgcolor="ffddd"
| April 18 || North Carolina A&T || || Sanford, Fla. || 6–10 || Poag (2–4) || Zuniga (5–4) || Garrett (1) || 81 || 14–28 || 12–7
|- align="center" bgcolor="ffddd"
| April 18 || North Carolina A&T || || Sanford, Fla. || 3–4 || Jantsch (1–1) || Norris (3–2) || || 82 || 14–29 || 12–8
|- bgcolor="#ddffdd"
| April 19 || North Carolina A&T || || Sanford, Fla. || 13–3 || Seibold (4–4) || Cantrell (0–6) || || 59 || 15–29 || 13–8
|- align="center" bgcolor="ffddd"
| April 21 || Florida || || Gainesville, Fla. || 1–2 || Poyner (3–1) || Clymer (0–3) || || 2446 || 15–30 ||
|- align="center" bgcolor="ffddd"
| April 22 || South Florida || || Tampa, Fla. || 5–7 || Valdes (5–1) || Pizarro (0–2) || Peterson (13) || 437 || 15–31 || 
|- align="center" bgcolor="ffddd"
| April 24 || Louisville || || Louisville, Ky. || 4–10 || Funkhouser (6–2) || Zuniga (5–5) || || 2075 || 15–32 || 
|- align="center" bgcolor="ffddd"
| April 25 || Louisville || || Louisville, Ky. || 2–7 || McKay (7–1) || Norris (3–3) || McClure (2) || 789 || 15–33 || 
|- align="center" bgcolor="ffddd"
| April 26 || Louisville || || Louisville, Ky. || 4–5 || Rogers (7–1) || Calamita (0–2) || Burdi (5) || 1947 || 15–34 ||
|-

References

Bethune-Cookman
Bethune–Cookman Wildcats baseball seasons
Bethune-Cookman Wildcats baseball